Mattéo Rabuel (born 4 May 2000) is a French professional footballer who plays as a centre-back for Valenciennes.

Club career
Rabuel is a youth product of Valenciennes and began his senior career with their reserves in 2019. On 15 May 2022, he made his senior and professional debut with in a 2–1 Ligue 2 win over Niort. On 1 June 2022, he signed his first professional contract with Valenciennes for one year. He had a strong start with Valenciennes, averaging over 2.5 points per game in the first months of the 2022–23 season.

Personal life
Rabuel is the son of Nicolas Rabuel who is a French football coach and former professional footballer.

References

External links
 

2000 births
Living people
Sportspeople from Charente
French footballers
Association football defenders
Valenciennes FC players
Ligue 2 players
Championnat National 3 players